The following is a timeline of the history of the city of San José, Costa Rica. The timeline was make a long time ago in San José in Costa Rica.

Prior to 20th century

 1738 - San José founded.
 1760 - Town hall in use (approximate date).
 1776 - Church built.
 1802 - Metropolitan Cathedral of San José built. 
 1808 - Population: 8,316.
 1812 - "Town council elected."
 1813 - San Jose attains city status.
 1814 -  (school) opens.
 1823 - San José becomes capital of Costa Rica.
 1824 - Population: 15,472.
 1835 - .
 1836 - Population: 17,965.
 1841 - 2 September: Earthquake.(es)
 1845
 Puntarenas-San Jose road built.
  established.
 1848 - Carmen District created.
 1850 - Roman Catholic diocese of San José de Costa Rica established.
 1855 -  built.
 1864 - Population: 8,863.
 1869 - Telegraph begins operating.
 1878 - Metropolitan Cathedral of San José and Estacion del Pacifico (rail station) built.
 1880 - Public market built (approximate date).
 1883 - Population: 13,484.
 1884 - Street lighting installed.
 1886 - Telephone begins operating.
 1887 -  (park) established.
 1889
 Streetcar begins operating.
 Laguna Swamp drained.
 1890 - Estacion del Atlantico (rail station) begins operating.
 1892 - Population: 19,326.
 1895 -  unveiled.
 1897 - National Theatre of Costa Rica opens.

20th century

 1904 - Population: 24,500.
 1907 -  (church) built (approximate date).
 1908 - Population: 26, 500 (approximate). 
 1910 -  relocated to San Jose (approximate date).
 1911 - Sociedad Gimnástica Española de San José (sport club) formed.
 1916 -  opens.
 1918 - Population: 38,016 city; 51,658 metro.
 1920 -  established.
 1921 -  opens.
 1924
 4 March: Earthquake.(es)
 National Stadium opens.
 1927 - Population: 50,580.
 1930 - Gran Hotel (Costa Rica) built.
 1948 - March–April: Costa Rican Civil War.
 1950 - Population: 86,909 city; 139,915 urban agglomeration.
 1958 -  (national congress building) constructed.
 1963 - March: Irazú Volcano erupts near city.
 1973 - Population: 215,441 city; 395,401 urban agglomeration.
 1977 - La Sabana Metropolitan Park established.
 1980 - United Nations' University for Peace established near San Jose.
 1985 - Pre-Columbian Gold Museum opens.
 1987 - Sister city relationship established with Puerto Vallarta, Mexico.
 1990 - City twinned with Almaty, Kazakhstan; Miami, USA; and San Jose, California, USA.
 1993 - April: Supreme Court of Justice hostage crisis.
 1994
 Museum of Contemporary Art and Design established.
 Population: 315,909 city; 1,186,417 urban agglomeration (estimate).
 1998 - Johnny Araya Monge becomes mayor.

21st century

 2000 - City twinned with Mexico City, Mexico.
 2008 - City twinned with Puebla, Mexico.
 2011
 National Stadium rebuilt.
 Population: 288,054.
 2012 - 5 September: 2012 Costa Rica earthquake occurs.
 2013 -  becomes mayor.

See also
 San José history

References

Bibliography

in English

in Spanish

External links

 Items related to San Jose, various dates (via Digital Public Library of America)
 Items related to San Jose, various dates (via Europeana)

San Jose
Costa Rica history-related lists
Years in Costa Rica
San Jose, Costa Rica